Butnaru is a surname. Notable people with the surname include:
Leo Butnaru, a writer from Moldova
Val Butnaru, a journalist and writer from Moldova
Valentina Butnaru, a journalist and activist from Moldova

Surnames of Moldovan origin
Occupational surnames